Lind-Bohanon is a northern neighborhood within the Camden community in Minneapolis.

Boundaries
The neighborhood's southern boundary is the Canadian Pacific Railway and Webber Parkway. Humboldt Avenue North and Shingle Creek, Minneapolis marks its border to the west. Its eastern boundary runs from north to south as follows: along the Mississippi River from 53rd Avenue North to 48th Avenue North, and then along Lyndale Avenue North from 48th Avenue to the Canadian Pacific Railway. 53rd Avenue North and  Brooklyn Center, MN border Lind-Bohanon to the north.

Parks and Recreation
Centered in Lind-Bohanon is Bohanon Park.
The North Mississippi Regional Park is a Minneapolis Park and Recreation Park. It lies along the western bank of the Mississippi River connecting Lind-Bohanon to the trails and paths of the Grand Rounds Scenic Byway and Anoka County parks and trails. The NMRP is home to the Carl Kroening Interpretive Center where naturalists give tours about the history and current state of the Mississippi River.

Humboldt Greenway
The Humboldt Greenway is a neighborhood revitalization program on Lind-Bohanon's western border. More than 200 World War II houses and local businesses were razed and replaced with newer single family homes, multifamily townhomes, Shingle Creek Commons apartments for seniors and Kingsley Commons apartments for persons with MS.

References

External links

Minneapolis Neighborhood Profile - Lind-Bohanon
Lind-Bohanon Neighborhood Association

Neighborhoods in Minneapolis
Minnesota populated places on the Mississippi River